Cecil Bruce "CB" Jennings  (16 August 1914 – 2 October 1989) was a South African rugby union player.

Biography

In 1937 Jennings toured with the Springboks to Australia and New Zealand. He played his only test match for  during the New Zealand leg of the tour, in the first test against the All Blacks on 14 August 1937 in Wellington. He also played ten tour matches and scored three tries.

During the War he served in the Rand Light Infantry in North Africa. He was a captain in the infantry and during a skirmish was wounded in both legs, causing him to spend months in hospital. After the war he returned to Johannesburg and coached the rugby team of the University of the Witwatersrand. in the mid-1950s he returned to King Williams Town and became involved in the activities of Dale College and served on the school board for several years. He also became a selector and coach of Border and also served five terms as mayor of King Williams Town. The rugby field at Dale College was named the CB Jennings rugby field in his honour.

Test history

See also
List of South Africa national rugby union players – Springbok no. 254

References

1914 births
1989 deaths
South African rugby union players
South Africa international rugby union players
Border Bulldogs players
Golden Lions players
Rugby union players from the Eastern Cape
Rugby union props